Lindsey Lee Ginter (born December 13, 1950) is an American actor.

He is known as Crew Cut Man, a government assassin, in the TV series The X-Files and as Sam Austen, Kate Austen's father, in Lost.

Early life
Ginter was born in Alameda, California on December 13, 1950.

Career
Ginter appears in films including Blood In Blood Out, Beverly Hills Cop III, Gattaca, Mercury Rising, Pearl Harbor, S.W.A.T., The L.A. Riot Spectacular, Transformers: Dark of the Moon and Argo.

Filmography

References

External links 
 

1950 births
American male film actors
American male television actors
People from Alameda, California
Living people